COK or Cok may refer to:

Arts and entertainment
 Champions of Krynn, a role-playing video game
 "The Call of Ktulu", a song by thrash metal band Metallica
 Code Orange Kids, former name of an American rock band that formed in 2008
 A Clash of Kings, the second novel in George R. R. Martin's series A Song of Ice and Fire

Other uses
 Cook Islands, a self-governing island country in the South Pacific Ocean
 Cok (surname), a surname
 Cochin International Airport (IATA code), India
 Animal Outlook (formerly Compassion Over Killing; COK), an animal advocacy group
 Center for offentlig kompetenceudvikling, the Danish municipalities' and regions' nationwide organization for training and development
 China-occupied Kashmir, an Indian term for the Chinese-controlled part of Kashmir